Melex is an electric vehicle produced by a company of the same name in Mielec, Poland. It has been in production since 1971.

The car, having full necessary equipment such as headlamps and seatbelts, is very quiet and does not pollute the environment, so it is usually used in places where standard cars are not allowed. It is also smaller but slower than them – the maximum speed is about 30 km/h or 19 mph, depending on the version. Depending on jurisdiction, some versions may require a driver's license to operate because of their size.

At first, the cars were used as golf carts, but now there are many versions that include:
 Passenger/Tourist versions (max 8)
 Truck versions (up to 1250 kg of cargo),
 Special (including: ambulances, hearses etc.)

Typical uses include quiet places, such as parks, zoological gardens, cemeteries or in factories, mostly to transport people or cargo over short distances, where speed or noise is undesirable or not allowed. 

The standard and most common Melex has no doors and can carry up to two people (a driver and a passenger). It can contain more seats for more passengers and/or baggage.

It is equipped with a battery and rectifier for recharging.

History 
Back in 1970, Polish-born engineer Stan Siedlecki, an engineer working in the U.S. for Continental Moss Gordon in Prattville, Alabama, came up with the idea for the Melex after working on an overseas project. The project required an electric motor to run equipment located at an overseas cotton gin plant. After learning that the electric motors he originally selected would be subject to a lengthy delivery delay, Siedlecki needed another option. Luckily, he found a distributor who could supply a Polish motor produced by a company named Celma, which was located in Cieszyn, Poland. Siedlecki placed his order, received the motors, finished his business activities, and returned to the U.S.

Arriving back in the U.S., a chance ride in a golf cart used to transport employees across a factory floor sparked an idea. While riding in the cart, Siedlecki realized that Celma’s low-cost electric motor could be used for more than powering a cotton gin. It could also power a golf cart.

In a fortunate turn of events, it also happened that Celma was interested in selling their electric motors in the U.S. To move forward with his idea, Siedlecki needed a manufacturer for the golf cart body. Siedlecki was aware of a factory in his hometown of Mielec, Poland that could produce the cart. This wasn’t just any factory, however. This factory was a part of his personal heritage. His stepfather, Adam Krysiewicz, built the original plant in Mielec. Armed with his idea and a commitment to making the business a reality, Siedlecki began reaching out to potential investors.

Despite several initial funding setbacks, by mid-July 1970, he had secured a signed contract for 25,000 carts to be produced over a 4-year period. As a result of his efforts, the Lelex was produced in Poland, then shipped and sold in the U.S. Just 10 carts shipped on that first order in December 1970. Little could Siedlecki have realized at the time how quickly the business would grow and how popular the carts would become in the U.S.

Siedlecki’s contributions to the development of the Melex were substantial. Not only is he responsible for the original idea to produce the cart in Poland, his efforts also secured the investors and contractual agreements needed to produce the carts and ship them to the U.S. His efforts weren’t limited to facilitating business transactions, however. He also came up with the name “Melex. “

The idea for the name Melex came to Siedlecki in July 1970 while touring the WSK-Mielec factory in Poland as part of a celebration marking the end of contract negotiations related to the production of the Melex. Until that time, the Melex had been referred to generically in business documents as the “Golf Cart.” During the tour of the factory, a factory manager asked the group what the cart would be called. Siedlecki picked up a napkin and wrote the word “MELEX,” which is the phonetic pronunciation of “Mielec,” the name of the town where the factory is located.  While considering a name for the golf cart, Siedlecki likely realized that it would be hard to sell it if buyers didn’t know how to pronounce the product name. With that thought in mind, Siedlecki had the foresight to recognize that using phonetic pronunciation was the only way Americans would be able to pronounce Mielec.

Siedlecki is responsible for creating the logo. He created a handwritten drawing on the same napkin he used to write the name Melex. This drawing would become the logo for the cart. 

With contracts secured, production was undertaken quickly. By the fall of 1970, a contract was in force and production began. While only a few carts were available for sale in 1970, during the years which followed sales of the Melex grew quickly. In December 1970, the company initially exported 10 carts to the U.S. In 1971, exports to the U.S. increased dramatically, resulting in 1,000 carts being sold in the U.S. In 1972, demand grew substantially yet again. This time resulting in the sale of 3,000 carts. Demand continued to grow at a rapid pace. In 1973, sales doubled over the previous year, resulting in the sale of 6,000 carts. By the mid-1970s, the Melex had broken into the U.S. market in a commanding way and was a serious competitor in its electric vehicle market.

External links 
  (in Polish and English)
A Brief History of Melex Golf Carts at Vintage Golf Cart Parts
Melex History
 Official site of Electrocar B.V., Dutch Electrocar Manufacturer and Melex Retailer

Electric vehicles
Science and technology in Poland
Polish brands
Vehicles introduced in 1971
Products introduced in 1971